Thomas Blood Parker was an English professional footballer who played as a centre half in the Football League for Portsmouth, Luton Town and Wrexham.

Personal life 
During the First World War, Parker served as a driver in the Army Service Corps and as a gunner in the Royal Field Artillery.

Honours 
Portsmouth
 Football League Third Division South: 1923–24

Career statistics

References

1893 births
People from Fenton, Staffordshire
English footballers
English Football League players
British Army personnel of World War I
Royal Army Service Corps soldiers
Royal Field Artillery soldiers
Year of death missing
Bolsover Colliery F.C. players
Luton Town F.C. players
Portsmouth F.C. players
Wrexham A.F.C. players
Association football midfielders